Hall of Fame 2.0 is a reissued studio album by American rapper Polo G. It was released on December 3, 2021, as the deluxe edition and sequel of his third studio album, Hall of Fame, which was released earlier in 2021. The reissued album features new guest appearances from Lil Baby, Moneybagg Yo, YungLiv, NLE Choppa, and Lil Tjay.

Background
Polo G planned to release the deluxe edition of Hall of Fame in October 2021. In the same month, he announced that its deluxe edition would be a separate album, titled Hall of Fame 2.0, and would be released in a "few more weeks". On November 8, 2021, he revealed the release date of the album to be December 3, 2021, while also announcing the release date of the lead single, "Bad Man (Smooth Criminal)" for November 12, 2021. He revealed the tracklist for the reissued album on November 22, 2021. The album has been described as "a fitting title for the deluxe edition of Polo G's 2021 breakthrough album — after all, there are 14 new songs to absorb and even more new stories of the complexities of fame, making the project more a fresh version than an add-on".

Track listing

Charts

Notes

References

2021 albums
Polo G albums